R v Secretary of State for Foreign and Commonwealth Affairs, ex parte Bancoult (No 2) [2008] UKHL 61 is a UK constitutional law case in the House of Lords concerning the removal of the Chagos Islanders and the exercise of the Royal Prerogative. The Chagos Islands, acquired by the United Kingdom in 1814, were reorganised as the British Indian Ocean Territory (BIOT) in 1965 for the purpose of removing its inhabitants. Under a 1971 Order in Council, the Chagossians were forcibly removed, and the central island of Diego Garcia leased to the United States for use as a military outpost.

In 2000, Olivier Bancoult brought a judicial review claim against the Secretary of State for Foreign and Commonwealth Affairs for the initial ordinance which led to the Chagossian removal. Bancoult sought a writ of certiorari on the grounds that the ordinance was ultra vires ("beyond power" – that is, that the ordinance had been made without legal authority), a claim upheld by both the Divisional Court and the Court of Appeal. In response, Robin Cook, the Foreign Secretary, repealed the 1971 Order in Council and announced he would not appeal against the decision, allowing the Chagossians to return home.

In 2004, a second Order in Council, the British Indian Ocean Territory (Constitution) Order 2004, was produced, again reinstating the off-limits nature of the Chagos Islands. Bancoult brought a second case, arguing that this Order was again ultra vires and unreasonable, and that the British government had violated legitimate expectation by passing the second Order after giving the impression that the Chagossians were free to return home.

The new Order was again struck down by the Divisional Court and Court of Appeal before proceeding to the House of Lords where it was heard by Lords Hoffmann, Bingham, Rodger, Carswell and Mance between 30 June and 3 July 2008. In their judgment, issued on 22 October 2008, the Lords decided by a 3–2 majority to uphold the new Order in Council, stating that it was valid and, although judicial review actions could look at Orders in Council, the national security and foreign relations issues in the case barred them from doing so. In addition, Cook's statement had not been clear and unambiguous enough to provide legitimate expectation.

The reaction to the decision was negative, with academics accusing the majority Law Lords of failing to do their job as members of the judiciary to "rework things like neo-imperial texts and outdated legal attitudes to the prerogative in order to cure obvious injustices and to vindicate a modern conception of the rule of law"; at the same time, their approach to legitimate expectation was also questioned, with the case described as an "unfortunate regression" from Council of Civil Service Unions v Minister for the Civil Service, where judges were willing to debate legitimate expectation in a similarly politically sensitive situation.

In 2015 Bancoult went to court to argue that the judgement should be set aside due to the non-disclosure of a 2002 feasibility study relating to the resettlement of the former inhabitants of the Chagos Islands. The Supreme Court of the United Kingdom ruled against reviewing the case on 29 June 2016 (R (on the application of Bancoult (No 2)) v Secretary of State for Foreign and Commonwealth Affairs).

Facts

Chagos Islands

The Chagos Islands are a cluster of 60 islands and seven atolls in the Indian Ocean. First occupied by lepers from Mauritius, France acquired the islands in the late 18th century, and slaves were brought in from Africa and India to maintain coconut plantations placed there. Following Napoleon's defeat in 1814, the islands were ceded to the British in the Treaty of Paris, who administered them as a dependency of the Colony of Mauritius. Although the slaves were given their freedom in 1835, many remained on the Chagos Islands as contract workers, and their descendants and later immigrants are considered the indigenous people – the Chagossians.

In 1965, the British government reconstituted the islands as the British Indian Ocean Territory (BIOT) through the British Indian Ocean Territory Order 1965, a statutory instrument under the Colonial Boundaries Act 1895. This instrument created the office of "Commissioner of BIOT", who given power to "make laws for the peace, order and good government of the territory". Accordingly, the Commissioner issued the Immigration Ordinance 1971, an Order in Council under the Royal Prerogative which required anyone entering or remaining in BIOT to seek permission beforehand.

This ordinance, with the reorganisation of the islands, was enacted to provide a method for removing the Chagos Islanders so that the islands could be used by the United States as a military base, particularly the island of Diego Garcia. From 1964 onwards the United States and United Kingdom had been in talks about leasing Diego Garcia to the US for military purposes, and by an exchange of notes dated 30 December 1966, the UK government transferred Diego Garcia to the US for the purpose of hosting a defensive communications base. This agreement was to last for 50 years, with an additional 20-year extension if neither party wished to withdraw.

Between 1967 and 1972 all 1,600 islanders were evacuated, and Diego Garcia continues to play a vital role in US military operations. Following a billion-dollar expansion program, the base has served as a "bomber forward operating location" for offensive operations in Afghanistan and Iraq. A US State Department letter dated 21 June 2000 described it as an "all but indispensable platform".

Bancoult (No 1)

In 2000, Olivier Bancoult, a native Chagossian and leader of the Chagos Refugees Group, brought a judicial review claim against the Secretary of State for Foreign and Commonwealth Affairs for the initial ordinance which led to the Chagossian removal. Bancoult sought a writ of certiorari on the grounds that the ordinance was ultra vires and failed the Wednesbury test of reasonableness, as it was irrational.

The case, R (Bancoult) v Secretary of State for Foreign and Commonwealth Affairs, went to the Divisional Court, where it was heard by judges Richard Gibbs and John Laws. Bancoult's argument was made on several grounds: firstly, that the Crown could not exclude a British citizen from British territory, except in times of war, without a valid statutory basis or prerogative power. Secondly, the Chagossians had a constitutional right to inhabit their land under the Magna Carta, one which could not be abridged with delegated legislation, and third, the Commissioner of BIOT's duty to legislate "for the peace, order and good government" of BIOT's inhabitants could not be said to be fulfilled by relocating those inhabitants.

The respondent, the Foreign & Commonwealth Office (FCO), argued that the English courts had no jurisdiction over the case, since the Crown is divisible amongst its territories, and the BIOT had its own courts. According to the FCO, Magna Carta, as a British constitutional document, was inapplicable to the Chagos Islands. They also maintained that "make laws for the peace, order and good government of the Territory" gave the Commissioner a wide enough jurisdiction to account for the order forcibly removing the Chagossians, and that the court could not decide in such a way as to force the government to break its treaty with the United States.

The Divisional Court gave its judgment on 3 November 2000, on three main issues: firstly, the court's right to hear the case; secondly, the Chagossians' constitutional right of residence; and, thirdly, the status of the Commissioner's actions. The court found that it did have discretion to hear the case: while the Crown was divisible, the actions of the BIOT were clearly the actions of the British government, since every BIOT action was ordered and dealt with by the Foreign and Commonwealth Office. Laws J found that the Magna Carta did apply to foreign nations, as it was "the nearest approach to an irreplaceable 'fundamental statute' that England has ever had ... For in brief it means this, that the King is and shall be below the law". This did not alone validate Bancoult's case, since it did not mean that the government's actions were illegal.

The final section of the judgment was on the legality of the Commissioner's 1971 ordinance. Laws J held that it was "elementary" that "a legislature created by a measure passed by a body which is legally prior to it must act within the confines of the power thereby conferred"; in this case that the Commissioner's jurisdiction was to legislate "for the peace, order and good government" of BIOT. While the latitude given to the Commissioner was wide, it "may be a very large tapestry, but every tapestry has a border". The court found that in the 1971 ordinance, the Commissioner had exceeded his authority, and the ordinance was made ultra vires. Therefore, the ordinance was quashed.

Government response

In response to the Divisional Court's decision, Foreign Secretary Robin Cook stated on 3 November 2000 that he would accept the ruling, issuing the Immigration Ordinance 2000 which repealed the 1971 ordinance in its entirety. Due to "security issues", the British government was only prepared to let the Chagossians return to the outer islands, which were lacking in basic amenities.  A "feasibility study" was conducted; a preliminary study was produced on 20 June 2000 and the full study was published on 10 July 2002. It concluded that:

On 1 June 2004, a second Order in Council was producedthe British Indian Ocean Territory (Constitution) Order 2004Section 9 of which provided that "no person has the right of abode in the territory" and "no person is entitled to enter or be present in the territory except as authorised by or under this Order or any other law for the time being in force in the territory". At the same time, the British Indian Ocean Territory (Immigration) Order 2004 came into effect, prohibiting entry to or presence in BIOT without a permit. In response, Bancoult brought a second case, claiming that Cook's statement had created a legitimate expectation (later frustrated by the 2004 orders) and questioning the validity of the Constitution Order 2004, particularly the legality of Section 9.

Judgment
The case first went to the Divisional Court, where Hooper LJ and Cresswell J decided in favour of Bancoult on 11 May 2006. The court found that the "interests of BIOT must be or must primarily be those whose right of abode and unrestricted right to enter and remain was being in effect removed", and that as Section 9 of the Constitutional Order did not serve the interests of it or its inhabitants, it was irrational. At the same time, the court was asked to rule on whether an Order in Council could be questioned in judicial review proceedings. It decided that, under Council of Civil Service Unions v Minister for the Civil Service, the decisive element was not the origin of the power (in this case, the Royal Prerogative) but the nature of the power. Accordingly, Orders in Council were subject to judicial review. This decision was appealed to the Court of Appeal of England and Wales, composed of Butler-Sloss, Sedley and Neuberger LJJ, who agreed with the Divisional Court in their judgment issued on 23 May 2007.

House of Lords
The case was then taken to the House of Lords, where it was heard by Lords Hoffmann, Bingham, Rodger, Carswell and Mance. The pleadings occurred between 30 June and 3 July 2008, and judgment was issued on 22 October 2008. The judgment covered two matters: firstly, whether the courts could subject Orders in Council to judicial review; and, secondly, the legality of the 2004 Order. The Lords unanimously agreed that, while Orders in Council are pieces of primary legislation, similar to Acts of Parliament (which cannot be subject to judicial review), there is a significant difference in that Orders in Council are an executive product and lack the "representative character" that comes with Parliamentary authority and approval. Accordingly, Lord Hoffmann stated:

However, by a majority of 3 to 2, the Lords upheld the legality of the Constitutional Order, including Section 9. The majorityLords Hoffmann, Rodger and Carswellheld that BIOT was a "conquered or ceded colony" and therefore was subject to the prerogative powers of the Crown. They rejected the principle that there was a constitutional right to reside in one's own country, calling it "extreme", and concluded that in any case no such right could not trump legislation such as an Order in Council. The phrase "peace, order and good government", they thought, should be understood as referring not just to the inhabitants of BIOT but to the governance of the region. The wording was to be treated "as apt to confer plenary lawmaking authority" and reviewing the Order was a matter for the government and Parliament, not for the courts, since it was a political issue of national security and foreign relations. At the same time, no legitimate expectation had been created following Bancoult (No 1). The standard requirement for legitimate expectation, as decided in R v North and East Devon Health Authority, ex parte Coughlan, was that there must be a "clear and unambiguous" promise made that led to a reliance or a detriment; Robin Cook's statement after the first Bancoult case could not be described as a clear and unambiguous promise of resettlement, and the requirements of reliance and detriment were not met.

Lords Bingham and Mance, dissenting, took the view that the Order in Council was unreasonable and therefore invalid. Bingham noted that the proper way to interpret an exercise of the royal prerogative was to look at how it had been exercised previously, and that he could not find any previous record of the prerogative being used to "exile an indigenous population from its homeland".  He argued that this prerogative power did not exist: "[t]he Crown has never had a prerogative power to prevent its subjects from entering the Kingdom, or to expel them from it". Accordingly, the Order was ultra vires. Bingham also maintained that it was irrational, since visits to the outer islands did not threaten US security, and unacceptable, in that no consideration had been given to the Chagossians. On the subject of legitimate expectation, the dissenters maintained that the statement should be "construed according to the ordinary meaning that would be attached to it by those, principally the Chagossians and their supporters, to whom it was directed"; Bingham saw the ordinary meaning as being that the Chagossians would be allowed to return home.

Significance
Bancoult was the first case to directly state that, where there is a legitimate expectation, the information must have been relied upon, leading to a detriment. In prior cases it was simply an additional element, and not explicitly required. At the same time, Bancoult raised questions about the oversight of Orders in Council, given that it highlighted the courts are unwilling to review a piece of executive legislation where there are political elements in play. The decision also raised "the classic problem of balancing human rights issues and concerns relating to security and defence".

The public and academic reaction to the decision was negative. Thomas Poole considered that the Law Lords had failed in their duty as members of the judiciary: "where old principles no longer fit contemporary constitutional and moral standards, why should we follow them? Surely the judicial task is to rework things like neo-imperial texts and outdated legal attitudes to the prerogative in order to cure obvious injustices and to vindicate a modern conception of the rule of law". Margit Cohn agreed, writing on the legitimate expectation issue that "It is difficult to accept that a public statement made by a Secretary of State, followed by the promulgation of an order that removed the previous prohibition to return, could not have created at least some sort of expectation". Cohn further described the case as an "unfortunate regression" from the GCHQ case, where judges had been willing to debate legitimate expectation in a similarly politically sensitive situation. T. T. Arvind went further, drawing parallels with the judicial response to the Zong Massacre to argue that the decision, despite its formalist rhetoric, was in reality a pragmatic one which abandoned centuries of settled constitutional jurisprudence in relation to the limited scope of the Royal Prerogative.

References

Bibliography

2008 in case law
Chagos Archipelago sovereignty dispute
British Indian Ocean Territory
Foreign, Commonwealth and Development Office
House of Lords cases
Royal prerogative
United Kingdom administrative case law
Bancoult
Bancoult